James Albert MacPherson (March 31, 1927 in Edmonton, Alberta – August 31, 1988), known as Bud MacPherson or Jim MacPherson, was a Canadian ice hockey defenceman. He was inducted to the Alberta Sports Hall of Fame and Museum in 2005 as a member of the 1947-48 Edmonton Flyers Hockey Team.

References

External links

1927 births
1988 deaths
Buffalo Bisons (AHL) players
Canadian expatriate ice hockey players in the United States
Canadian ice hockey defencemen
Canadian people of Scottish descent
Cincinnati Mohawks (AHL) players
Edmonton Flyers (WHL) players
Hershey Bears players
Montreal Canadiens players
Montreal Royals (QSHL) players
Oshawa Generals players
Place of death missing
Rochester Americans players
Ice hockey people from Edmonton
Stanley Cup champions